Colonel David George Carr Sutherland  (28 October 192014 March 2006) was a British Army officer, intelligence officer and military author.

Sutherland was educated at Eton College and the Royal Military College, Sandhurst. On 22 October 1939 he commissioned into the 6th Battalion, Black Watch and went to France as part of the British Expeditionary Force. He saw action in the Battle of France. In 1940 he joined No. 8 (Guards) Commando in the Middle East and participated in Operation Flipper. In 1941 Sutherland served with the 1 Special Boat Service before serving with 1 Special Air Service (D Squadron) in the Western Desert between 1942 and 1943. On 16 November 1942 he was awarded the Military Cross for his part in Operation Anglo; he received a Bar in September 1943. From 1943 to 1945 he was commanding officer of S Detachment of the Special Boat Squadron operating in Palestine and the Greek islands. He was mentioned in dispatches in January 1945 for "gallant & distinguished services against the enemy in the field."

Following the end of the Second World War, Sutherland was on the British military mission to Greece in 1946 (being awarded the Greek War Cross), before becoming an instructor at Sandhurst. He worked for MI5 throughout the period, in which he was appointed to advise on the security of the Kariba dam and oil installations in the Gulf before he was made head of station in Pakistan. Between 1956 and 1958 was commanding officer of 21 SAS Regiment. Sutherland served as deputy commander SAS Group from 1967 to 1972. In June 1974 he was invested as a Commander of the Order of the British Empire and retired as a colonel in 1977.

Sutherland served as deputy lieutenant for his home town of Peebles in 1974. He married twice and had one son and two daughters.

Publications
He Who Dares: Recollections of Service in the SAS, SBS and MI5 (1998)

References

1920 births
2006 deaths
Black Watch officers
British Army personnel of World War II
British military writers
Commanders of the Order of the British Empire
Deputy Lieutenants of Peeblesshire
Graduates of the Royal Military College, Sandhurst
MI5 personnel
People educated at Eton College
Recipients of the Military Cross
Special Air Service officers